Red Lady may refer to:
Red Lady of El Mirón, a female paleolithic skeleton
Red Lady of Paviland, a male paleolithic skeleton
Red Lady of Huntingdon College, a ghost

See also
 The Lady in Red (disambiguation)
 The Woman in Red (disambiguation)
 Scarlet woman (disambiguation)
 The Woman in the Red Dress, a minor character in the movie The Matrix
 Women in Red, a Wikiproject to create new articles about notable women